Bolbolabad may refer to:
 Bolbolabad, Hormozgan
 Bolbolabad, Kerman